The Bolivia national badminton team represents Bolivia in international badminton team competitions. The Bolivian national team is controlled by Federación Boliviana de Bádminton, also known as the Bolivian Badminton Federation located in Sucre. The team competes under the Badminton Pan America confederation.

The Bolivian team participated in badminton at the 2018 South American Games where the team was qualified as the host team.

Participation in South American Games

Current squad 
The following players were selected to represent Bolivia at the 2018 South American Games.

Men
Roly Toledo
Paolo Arauz
Henry Mendoza Meruvia
Esteban Limache

Women
Ángela Condori
Daniela Barrientos
Flora Rojas
Juanita Siviora

References 

Badminton
National badminton teams